Cormacan Eigeas (died 946) was an Irish poet.

Cormacan Eigeas mac Maelbrighdhe was Chief Ollam of Ireland. Eigeas denoted 'the Learned'. He was chief poet to Muirchertach mac Néill, King of Ulster. He wrote a poem celebrating the king's tour of Ireland in 941–942, amongst others. Edward O'Reilly gives a full account of these in his Irish Writers, LXXXVI sq.; d. anno 941.

His obituary is given in the Annals of the Four Masters as follows:

References

External links
Annals of the Four Masters.

946 deaths
10th-century Irish poets
Year of birth unknown
Irish male poets
Irish-language writers